Antonio Pepito Palang (13 June 1943 – 21 April 2021) was a Filipino Roman Catholic bishop.

Palang was born in the Philippines and was ordained to the priesthood in 1972. He served as the titular bishop of Thuburbo Minus and as the bishop of the Apostolic Vicariate of San Jose in Mindoro, Philippines, from 2002 to 2018.

Notes

1943 births
2021 deaths
21st-century Roman Catholic bishops in the Philippines